Quercus afares, the African oak, is a species of oak native to Algeria and Tunisia. It has a very limited distribution in the coastal mountains of the eastern Tell Atlas in Algeria, and the Mogod-Kroumerie region of northwestern Tunisia. Quercus afares is deciduous, with a corky bark (thinner than that of the cork oak, Q. suber), and can reach 25–30 metres in height. It grows in dense stands, associated with cork oak at elevations as low as 200 metres, and with the semi-deciduous Algerian oak (Q. canariensis) from 700 to 1600 metres elevation. Q. afares can also be found in monospecific stands, especially above 1200 metres on soils damaged by fire. It is endemic to the eastern coastal portion of the Mediterranean conifer and mixed forests ecoregion.

Taxonomy
The relationship of Q. afares to other oaks was investigated in 2006. It was initially classified in Q. section Cerris, because of morphological similarities with two other species, Turkey oak (Quercus cerris) of southern Europe and chestnut-leaved oak (Quercus castaneifolia) of the Caucasus and northern Iran. A 2017 classification still places it in this section. A 2006 genetic analysis using both nuclear (allozymes) and chloroplastic markers found that Q. afares originated as a hybrid of Q. suber and Q. canariensis. Although it is common for oaks of related species to hybridize, the parent species of Q. afares are from genetically distant sections of the genus, Q. suber from section Cerris and Q. canariensis from section Mesobalanus. C. Mir et al. maintain that because Q. afares is genetically, morphologically and ecologically differentiated from its parental species, it should therefore be considered a stabilised hybrid species. Like Q. suber, it has a biennial reproductive cycle, corky bark, and similar fruit, and also does not occur on limestone soils. Unlike Q. suber, which is limited to coastal areas with mild winters, Q. afares shares the cold-tolerance of Q. canariensis which shares some of its mountain habitats.

References

 

afares
Flora of North Africa